Orphanopusia is a genus of sea snails, marine gastropod mollusks, in the family Costellariidae, the ribbed miters.

Species
Species within the genus Orphanopusia include:
 Orphanopusia osiridis (Issel, 1869)
 Orphanopusia patriarchalis (Gmelin, 1791)

References

External links
 W.O.Cernohorsky, The Mitridae of Fiji - The Veliger v. 8 (1965-1966)

Costellariidae
Monotypic gastropod genera